The second generation of the Mercedes-Benz CL-Class is the C215-chassis coupé of 1998–2006. It was considered by Mercedes as their premier model.

It is based on the 1998–2005 Mercedes-Benz S-Class (W220), though it rides on an  shorter wheelbase. Construction of the chassis was a unibody type unique to the CL Class, constructed of a steel floor pan, chassis rails and A pillars. With a bonded aluminium roof and rear wing sections, magnesium door frames and composite plastic used for the boot/trunk and front wings.

Sales in Germany started in August 1999 for the CL 500 V8.

The C215 exterior design and active suspension was previewed by the Mercedes-Benz F200 concept in 1996.

The CL-Class was offered as seven models: the naturally aspirated V8 powered CL 500, the naturally aspirated V8 powered CL 55 AMG, the supercharged V8 powered CL 55 AMG Kompressor, the naturally aspirated V12 powered CL 600, the naturally aspirated V12 powered CL 63 AMG, and the Bi-Turbo V12 powered CL 600 Bi-Turbo and CL 65 AMG Bi-Turbo. All models seat four.

Features and equipment

The CL-Class coupés came equipped with the very latest in Mercedes-Benz technology, and along with the S-Class sedans the CL coupés receive new technological features.

C215 was the second car (after the W220 S-Class) with Distronic: the first worldwide radar-assisted Autonomous cruise control system. It was the first car in the world with both low beam and high beam (Bi-Xenon) High Intensity Discharge headlamps.

The C215 was standard equipped with hydropneumatic suspension, the Active Body Control or ABC system. It is technically more advanced than standard Airmatic air suspension found on the W220 S-Class sibling, and keeps the car level even in fast corners, provides a comfort and sports setting. Also, the car height can be increased by using a button, increasing ground clearance (3 settings) for driving on difficult terrain, lowers automatically at higher speeds.

From 1999 through 2003, the V12-equipped cars featured a cylinder deactivation system called Active Cylinder Control. The feature was dropped when the  bi-turbo V12 was introduced. This disactivation feature allowed the CL 600 to get better fuel economy than the comparable CL 500 (when not equipped with ACC itself, an option for the V8), especially on the road where the six-cylinder operation could be effectively used. Essentially, the engine is two Mercedes six-cylinder series engines mated to a common crank with separate engine monitoring systems.

Cars with Designo option were available in exclusive colours and with high quality customisable interior appointments such as the optional natural stone veneer.

Safety

In 2003, the cars were upgraded with Pre-Safe precrash system and a newer electronics package that included a DVD-based navigation system instead of the CD-based COMAND system. Also, the engine options changed. The CL 55 AMG became supercharged allowing the car to accelerate from 0-60 mph in 4.27 sec according to Motor Trend and the V12 CL 600 had turbochargers added and a slight engine capacity reduction, from 5786 cc to 5513 cc. Both cars produced  the distinction, again, was the quietness of the CL 600 as compared to rather noisy CL 55 AMG. Albeit the CL 600 Bi Turbo official power figures were understated to preserve sales of the CL 55 AMG Kompressor models. The more powerful CL 65 produced .

Electronic Stability Program (ESP) and Brake Assist were standard features for difficult driving conditions and emergency maneuvers.

The C215 CL-Class added standard front and rear side curtain airbags. In total, the C215 features 8 airbags: 2 frontal (driver and passenger), 4 side airbags (one for each passenger, optional for rear seats) and 2 window-airbags.

LED brake lights were also standard issue on the C215. LED brake lights illuminate faster than conventional bulbs.

Comfort and convenience

 Optional Distronic cruise control, which could maintain a set distance between the CL-Class and any vehicle in front.
 Speedtronic adjustable speed limiter for not exceeding a set speed on roads with speed limits.
 Optional Keyless Go, a smart key entry and startup system.
 Rain-sensing windshield wipers.
 Light sensors to turn the headlights on and off automatically, depending on lighting circumstances. The instrument display and the COMAND screen's backlight and colour also adjust automatically depending on the ambient light situation.
 Parktronic visual and audible parking aid, with sensors in the front and rear bumpers. Also, the passenger side mirror can swivel down automatically when engaging reverse, to help see the curb.
 Automatically heated exterior mirrors.
 Fully automatic climate control system with pollen and charcoal filters and optional separate rear-seat climate controls.
 COMAND system combines the controls for audio systems, the television, the navigation and the telephone. COMAND based cars offer higher quality audio compared to the Audio 10 system.
 Optional BOSE sound system.
 Summer Open/Close - Ability to open and close all four windows and the sunroof at the same time upon entry and/or exit from the vehicle.
 Self opening and closing trunk.
 Self-closing doors.
 Electrically adjustable seats are standard. Optional were the memory function for the seats (standard in many countries on the larger engine models) and the multi-contour backrests with massage function.
 Easy entry/exit function.
 Auto-dimming interior and driver's side exterior rear view mirrors to prevent being dazzled by cars behind.
 bi-xenon headlamps
 Optional Linguatronic voice recognition system which can be used to control the audio system, navigation system, and a cellular telephone through voice commands.

Limited Editions

The  CL 63 AMG  was based on CL 600. The badge "63" was used on the rare and short-lived 2001 CL 63 AMG. These were produced in limited quantities for one month and offered exclusively by AMG, and only to selected customers in Europe and Asia, allegedly Heads of State. The CL 63 AMG was the rarest C215 CL of all, and only 26 examples were built in November 2001 (plate 51), some delivered in the UK and one for France registered in March 2002. These had a price of US $ 270,000.

In 2000 Mercedes-Benz presented the CL 55 AMG F1 Limited Edition model. With production limited to only 55 numbered examples, cars sported lighter carbon-ceramic (a world production car first) brake discs with special eight-piston Brembo calipers. Model was based on a standard naturally aspirated CL 55 AMG with identical performance values but better stopping power. Available only in metallic silver with black and silver leather interior with an option of sports bucket seats. F1 Limited Edition logos can be found on an illuminated door sills and on a carbon-fibre finished centre console along with a series number.

Engines

Production
According to Daimler, the C215 was produced in the following numbers:
 CL 500 (1998-2006) - 32,224
 CL 600 (1998-2002) - 6,348
 CL 600 (2002-2005) - 2,255
 CL 55 AMG (2000-2002) - 2,217
 CL 55 AMG (2002-2005) - 4,163
 CL 63 AMG (2001) - 26
 CL 65 AMG (2003-2005) - 777

Total production of the C215 CL-Class was 47,984 units (excluding 63 AMG model).

References

External links 

 Kleemann CL60

W215
W215
Cars introduced in 1999
Rear-wheel-drive vehicles
Full-size vehicles
Flagship vehicles
Luxury vehicles
Coupés
2000s cars